The 2023 Milwaukee Brewers season will be the 54th season for the Brewers in Milwaukee, the 26th in the National League, and 55th overall.

On August 24, 2022, MLB announced the 2023 season schedule.

Spring training
The Brewers finished spring training with a record of ?–? (? ties).

Season standings

National League Central

National League Wild Card

Current roster

Game log

Regular season

|-style=background:#
| 1 || March 30 || @ Cubs || 0–0 ||  ||  || — ||  || 0–0 || ?
|-style=background:#
| 2 || April 1 || @ Cubs || 0–0 ||  ||  || — ||  || 0–0 || ?
|-style=background:#
| 3 || April 2 || @ Cubs || 0–0 ||  ||  || — ||  || 0–0 || ?
|-style=background:#
| 4 || April 3 || Mets || 0–0 ||  ||  || — ||  || 0–0 || ?
|-style=background:#
| 5 || April 4 || Mets || 0–0 ||  ||  || — ||  || 0–0 || ?
|-style=background:#
| 6 || April 5 || Mets || 0–0 ||  ||  || — ||  || 0–0 || ?
|-style=background:#
| 7 || April 7 || Cardinals || 0–0 ||  ||  || — ||  || 0–0 || ?
|-style=background:#
| 8 || April 8 || Cardinals || 0–0 ||  ||  || — ||  || 0–0 || ?
|-style=background:#
| 9 || April 9 || Cardinals || 0–0 ||  ||  || — ||  || 0–0 || ?
|-style=background:#
| 10 || April 10 || @ Diamondbacks || 0–0 ||  ||  || — ||  || 0–0 || ?
|-style=background:#
| 11 || April 11 || @ Diamondbacks || 0–0 ||  ||  || — ||  || 0–0 || ?
|-style=background:#
| 12 || April 12 || @ Diamondbacks || 0–0 ||  ||  || — ||  || 0–0 || ?
|-style=background:#
| 13 || April 13 || @ Padres || 0–0 ||  ||  || — ||  || 0–0 || ?
|-style=background:#
| 14 || April 14 || @ Padres || 0–0 ||  ||  || — ||  || 0–0 || ?
|-style=background:#
| 15 || April 15 || @ Padres || 0–0 ||  ||  || — ||  || 0–0 || ?
|-style=background:#
| 16 || April 16 || @ Padres || 0–0 ||  ||  || — ||  || 0–0 || ?
|-style=background:#
| 17 || April 17 || @ Mariners || 0–0 ||  ||  || — ||  || 0–0 || ?
|-style=background:#
| 18 || April 18 || @ Mariners || 0–0 ||  ||  || — ||  || 0–0 || ?
|-style=background:#
| 19 || April 19 || @ Mariners || 0–0 ||  ||  || — ||  || 0–0 || ?
|-style=background:#
| 20 || April 21 || Red Sox || 0–0 ||  ||  || — ||  || 0–0 || ?
|-style=background:#
| 21 || April 22 || Red Sox || 0–0 ||  ||  || — ||  || 0–0 || ?
|-style=background:#
| 22 || April 23 || Red Sox || 0–0 ||  ||  || — ||  || 0–0 || ?
|-style=background:#
| 23 || April 24 || Tigers || 0–0 ||  ||  || — ||  || 0–0 || ?
|-style=background:#
| 24 || April 25 || Tigers || 0–0 ||  ||  || — ||  || 0–0 || ?
|-style=background:#
| 25 || April 26 || Tigers || 0–0 ||  ||  || — ||  || 0–0 || ?
|-style=background:#
| 26 || April 28 || Angels || 0–0 ||  ||  || — ||  || 0–0 || ?
|-style=background:#
| 27 || April 29 || Angels || 0–0 ||  ||  || — ||  || 0–0 || ?
|-style=background:#
| 28 || April 30 || Angels || 0–0 ||  ||  || — ||  || 0–0 || ?
|-

|-style=background:#
| 29 || May 2 || @ Rockies || 0–0 ||  ||  || — ||  || 0–0 || ?
|-style=background:#
| 30 || May 3 || @ Rockies || 0–0 ||  ||  || — ||  || 0–0 || ?
|-style=background:#
| 31 || May 4 || @ Rockies || 0–0 ||  ||  || — ||  || 0–0 || ?
|-style=background:#
| 32 || May 5 || @ Giants || 0–0 ||  ||  || — ||  || 0–0 || ?
|-style=background:#
| 33 || May 6 || @ Giants || 0–0 ||  ||  || — ||  || 0–0 || ?
|-style=background:#
| 34 || May 7 || @ Giants || 0–0 ||  ||  || — ||  || 0–0 || ?
|-style=background:#
| 35 || May 8 || Dodgers || 0–0 ||  ||  || — ||  || 0–0 || ?
|-style=background:#
| 36 || May 9 || Dodgers || 0–0 ||  ||  || — ||  || 0–0 || ?
|-style=background:#
| 37 || May 10 || Dodgers || 0–0 ||  ||  || — ||  || 0–0 || ?
|-style=background:#
| 38 || May 12 || Royals || 0–0 ||  ||  || — ||  || 0–0 || ?
|-style=background:#
| 39 || May 13 || Royals || 0–0 ||  ||  || — ||  || 0–0 || ?
|-style=background:#
| 40 || May 14 || Royals || 0–0 ||  ||  || — ||  || 0–0 || ?
|-style=background:#
| 41 || May 15 || @ Cardinals || 0–0 ||  ||  || — ||  || 0–0 || ?
|-style=background:#
| 42 || May 16 || @ Cardinals || 0–0 ||  ||  || — ||  || 0–0 || ?
|-style=background:#
| 43 || May 17 || @ Cardinals || 0–0 ||  ||  || — ||  || 0–0 || ?
|-style=background:#
| 44 || May 19 || @ Rays || 0–0 ||  ||  || — ||  || 0–0 || ?
|-style=background:#
| 45 || May 20 || @ Rays || 0–0 ||  ||  || — ||  || 0–0 || ?
|-style=background:#
| 46 || May 21 || @ Rays || 0–0 ||  ||  || — ||  || 0–0 || ?
|-style=background:#
| 47 || May 22 || Astros || 0–0 ||  ||  || — ||  || 0–0 || ?
|-style=background:#
| 48 || May 23 || Astros || 0–0 ||  ||  || — ||  || 0–0 || ?
|-style=background:#
| 49 || May 24 || Astros || 0–0 ||  ||  || — ||  || 0–0 || ?
|-style=background:#
| 50 || May 25 || Giants || 0–0 ||  ||  || — ||  || 0–0 || ?
|-style=background:#
| 51 || May 26 || Giants || 0–0 ||  ||  || — ||  || 0–0 || ?
|-style=background:#
| 52 || May 27 || Giants || 0–0 ||  ||  || — ||  || 0–0 || ?
|-style=background:#
| 53 || May 28 || Giants || 0–0 ||  ||  || — ||  || 0–0 || ?
|-style=background:#
| 54 || May 30 || @ Blue Jays || 0–0 ||  ||  || — ||  || 0–0 || ?
|-style=background:#
| 55 || May 31 || @ Blue Jays || 0–0 ||  ||  || — ||  || 0–0 || ?
|-

|-style=background:#
| 56 || June 1 || @ Blue Jays || 0–0 ||  ||  || — ||  || 0–0 || ?
|-style=background:#
| 57 || June 2 || @ Reds || 0–0 ||  ||  || — ||  || 0–0 || ?
|-style=background:#
| 58 || June 3 || @ Reds || 0–0 ||  ||  || — ||  || 0–0 || ?
|-style=background:#
| 59 || June 4 || @ Reds || 0–0 ||  ||  || — ||  || 0–0 || ?
|-style=background:#
| 60 || June 5 || @ Reds || 0–0 ||  ||  || — ||  || 0–0 || ?
|-style=background:#
| 61 || June 6 || Orioles || 0–0 ||  ||  || — ||  || 0–0 || ?
|-style=background:#
| 62 || June 7 || Orioles || 0–0 ||  ||  || — ||  || 0–0 || ?
|-style=background:#
| 63 || June 8 || Orioles || 0–0 ||  ||  || — ||  || 0–0 || ?
|-style=background:#
| 64 || June 9 || Athletics || 0–0 ||  ||  || — ||  || 0–0 || ?
|-style=background:#
| 65 || June 10 || Athletics || 0–0 ||  ||  || — ||  || 0–0 || ?
|-style=background:#
| 66 || June 11 || Athletics || 0–0 ||  ||  || — ||  || 0–0 || ?
|-style=background:#
| 67 || June 13 || @ Twins || 0–0 ||  ||  || — ||  || 0–0 || ?
|-style=background:#
| 68 || June 14 || @ Twins || 0–0 ||  ||  || — ||  || 0–0 || ?
|-style=background:#
| 69 || June 16 || Pirates || 0–0 ||  ||  || — ||  || 0–0 || ?
|-style=background:#
| 70 || June 17 || Pirates || 0–0 ||  ||  || — ||  || 0–0 || ?
|-style=background:#
| 71 || June 18 || Pirates || 0–0 ||  ||  || — ||  || 0–0 || ?
|-style=background:#
| 72 || June 19 || Diamondbacks || 0–0 ||  ||  || — ||  || 0–0 || ?
|-style=background:#
| 73 || June 20 || Diamondbacks || 0–0 ||  ||  || — ||  || 0–0 || ?
|-style=background:#
| 74 || June 21 || Diamondbacks || 0–0 ||  ||  || — ||  || 0–0 || ?
|-style=background:#
| 75 || June 23 || @ Guardians || 0–0 ||  ||  || — ||  || 0–0 || ?
|-style=background:#
| 76 || June 24 || @ Guardians || 0–0 ||  ||  || — ||  || 0–0 || ?
|-style=background:#
| 77 || June 25 || @ Guardians || 0–0 ||  ||  || — ||  || 0–0 || ?
|-style=background:#
| 78 || June 26 || @ Mets || 0–0 ||  ||  || — ||  || 0–0 || ?
|-style=background:#
| 79 || June 27 || @ Mets || 0–0 ||  ||  || — ||  || 0–0 || ?
|-style=background:#
| 80 || June 28 || @ Mets || 0–0 ||  ||  || — ||  || 0–0 || ?
|-style=background:#
| 81 || June 29 || @ Mets || 0–0 ||  ||  || — ||  || 0–0 || ?
|-style=background:#
| 82 || June 30 || @ Pirates || 0–0 ||  ||  || — ||  || 0–0 || ?
|-

|-style=background:#
| 83 || July 1 || @ Pirates || 0–0 ||  ||  || — ||  || 0–0 || ?
|-style=background:#
| 84 || July 2 || @ Pirates || 0–0 ||  ||  || — ||  || 0–0 || ?
|-style=background:#
| 85 || July 3 || Cubs || 0–0 ||  ||  || — ||  || 0–0 || ?
|-style=background:#
| 86 || July 4 || Cubs || 0–0 ||  ||  || — ||  || 0–0 || ?
|-style=background:#
| 87 || July 5 || Cubs || 0–0 ||  ||  || — ||  || 0–0 || ?
|-style=background:#
| 88 || July 6 || Cubs || 0–0 ||  ||  || — ||  || 0–0 || ?
|-style=background:#
| 89 || July 7 || Reds || 0–0 ||  ||  || — ||  || 0–0 || ?
|-style=background:#
| 90 || July 8 || Reds || 0–0 ||  ||  || — ||  || 0–0 || ?
|-style=background:#
| 91 || July 9 || Reds || 0–0 ||  ||  || — ||  || 0–0 || ?
|-style=background:#bcf
| ASG || July 11 || NL @ AL??? || 0–0 ||  ||  || — ||  || 0–0 || ?
|-style=background:#
| 92 || July 14 || @ Reds || 0–0 ||  ||  || — ||  || 0–0 || ?
|-style=background:#
| 93 || July 15 || @ Reds || 0–0 ||  ||  || — ||  || 0–0 || ?
|-style=background:#
| 94 || July 16 || @ Reds || 0–0 ||  ||  || — ||  || 0–0 || ?
|-style=background:#
| 95 || July 18 || @ Phillies || 0–0 ||  ||  || — ||  || 0–0 || ?
|-style=background:#
| 96 || July 19 || @ Phillies || 0–0 ||  ||  || — ||  || 0–0 || ?
|-style=background:#
| 97 || July 20 || @ Phillies || 0–0 ||  ||  || — ||  || 0–0 || ?
|-style=background:#
| 98 || July 21 || Braves || 0–0 ||  ||  || — ||  || 0–0 || ?
|-style=background:#
| 99 || July 22 || Braves || 0–0 ||  ||  || — ||  || 0–0 || ?
|-style=background:#
| 100 || July 23 || Braves || 0–0 ||  ||  || — ||  || 0–0 || ?
|-style=background:#
| 101 || July 24 || Reds || 0–0 ||  ||  || — ||  || 0–0 || ?
|-style=background:#
| 102 || July 25 || Reds || 0–0 ||  ||  || — ||  || 0–0 || ?
|-style=background:#
| 103 || July 26 || Reds || 0–0 ||  ||  || — ||  || 0–0 || ?
|-style=background:#
| 104 || July 28 || @ Braves || 0–0 ||  ||  || — ||  || 0–0 || ?
|-style=background:#
| 105 || July 29 || @ Braves || 0–0 ||  ||  || — ||  || 0–0 || ?
|-style=background:#
| 106 || July 30 || @ Braves || 0–0 ||  ||  || — ||  || 0–0 || ?
|-style=background:#
| 107 || July 31 || @ Nationals || 0–0 ||  ||  || — ||  || 0–0 || ?
|-

|-style=background:#
| 108 || August 1 || @ Nationals || 0–0 ||  ||  || — ||  || 0–0 || ?
|-style=background:#
| 109 || August 2 || @ Nationals || 0–0 ||  ||  || — ||  || 0–0 || ?
|-style=background:#
| 110 || August 3 || Pirates || 0–0 ||  ||  || — ||  || 0–0 || ?
|-style=background:#
| 111 || August 4 || Pirates || 0–0 ||  ||  || — ||  || 0–0 || ?
|-style=background:#
| 112 || August 5 || Pirates || 0–0 ||  ||  || — ||  || 0–0 || ?
|-style=background:#
| 113 || August 6 || Pirates || 0–0 ||  ||  || — ||  || 0–0 || ?
|-style=background:#
| 114 || August 7 || Rockies || 0–0 ||  ||  || — ||  || 0–0 || ?
|-style=background:#
| 115 || August 8 || Rockies || 0–0 ||  ||  || — ||  || 0–0 || ?
|-style=background:#
| 116 || August 9 || Rockies || 0–0 ||  ||  || — ||  || 0–0 || ?
|-style=background:#
| 117 || August 11 || @ White Sox || 0–0 ||  ||  || — ||  || 0–0 || ?
|-style=background:#
| 118 || August 12 || @ White Sox || 0–0 ||  ||  || — ||  || 0–0 || ?
|-style=background:#
| 119 || August 13 || @ White Sox || 0–0 ||  ||  || — ||  || 0–0 || ?
|-style=background:#
| 120 || August 15 || @ Dodgers || 0–0 ||  ||  || — ||  || 0–0 || ?
|-style=background:#
| 121 || August 16 || @ Dodgers || 0–0 ||  ||  || — ||  || 0–0 || ?
|-style=background:#
| 122 || August 17 || @ Dodgers || 0–0 ||  ||  || — ||  || 0–0 || ?
|-style=background:#
| 123 || August 18 || @ Rangers || 0–0 ||  ||  || — ||  || 0–0 || ?
|-style=background:#
| 124 || August 19 || @ Rangers || 0–0 ||  ||  || — ||  || 0–0 || ?
|-style=background:#
| 125 || August 20 || @ Rangers || 0–0 ||  ||  || — ||  || 0–0 || ?
|-style=background:#
| 126 || August 22 || Twins || 0–0 ||  ||  || — ||  || 0–0 || ?
|-style=background:#
| 127 || August 23 || Twins || 0–0 ||  ||  || — ||  || 0–0 || ?
|-style=background:#
| 128 || August 25 || Padres || 0–0 ||  ||  || — ||  || 0–0 || ?
|-style=background:#
| 129 || August 26 || Padres || 0–0 ||  ||  || — ||  || 0–0 || ?
|-style=background:#
| 130 || August 27 || Padres || 0–0 ||  ||  || — ||  || 0–0 || ?
|-style=background:#
| 131 || August 28 || @ Cubs || 0–0 ||  ||  || — ||  || 0–0 || ?
|-style=background:#
| 132 || August 29 || @ Cubs || 0–0 ||  ||  || — ||  || 0–0 || ?
|-style=background:#
| 133 || August 30 || @ Cubs || 0–0 ||  ||  || — ||  || 0–0 || ?
|-

|-style=background:#
| 134 || September 1 || Phillies || 0–0 ||  ||  || — ||  || 0–0 || ?
|-style=background:#
| 135 || September 2 || Phillies || 0–0 ||  ||  || — ||  || 0–0 || ?
|-style=background:#
| 136 || September 3 || Phillies || 0–0 ||  ||  || — ||  || 0–0 || ?
|-style=background:#
| 137 || September 4 || @ Pirates || 0–0 ||  ||  || — ||  || 0–0 || ?
|-style=background:#
| 138 || September 5 || @ Pirates || 0–0 ||  ||  || — ||  || 0–0 || ?
|-style=background:#
| 139 || September 6 || @ Pirates || 0–0 ||  ||  || — ||  || 0–0 || ?
|-style=background:#
| 140 || September 8 || @ Yankees || 0–0 ||  ||  || — ||  || 0–0 || ?
|-style=background:#
| 141 || September 9 || @ Yankees || 0–0 ||  ||  || — ||  || 0–0 || ?
|-style=background:#
| 142 || September 10 || @ Yankees || 0–0 ||  ||  || — ||  || 0–0 || ?
|-style=background:#
| 143 || September 11 || Marlins || 0–0 ||  ||  || — ||  || 0–0 || ?
|-style=background:#
| 144 || September 12 || Marlins || 0–0 ||  ||  || — ||  || 0–0 || ?
|-style=background:#
| 145 || September 13 || Marlins || 0–0 ||  ||  || — ||  || 0–0 || ?
|-style=background:#
| 146 || September 14 || Marlins || 0–0 ||  ||  || — ||  || 0–0 || ?
|-style=background:#
| 147 || September 15 || Nationals || 0–0 ||  ||  || — ||  || 0–0 || ?
|-style=background:#
| 148 || September 16 || Nationals || 0–0 ||  ||  || — ||  || 0–0 || ?
|-style=background:#
| 149 || September 17 || Nationals || 0–0 ||  ||  || — ||  || 0–0 || ?
|-style=background:#
| 150 || September 18 || @ Cardinals || 0–0 ||  ||  || — ||  || 0–0 || ?
|-style=background:#
| 151 || September 19 || @ Cardinals || 0–0 ||  ||  || — ||  || 0–0 || ?
|-style=background:#
| 152 || September 20 || @ Cardinals || 0–0 ||  ||  || — ||  || 0–0 || ?
|-style=background:#
| 153 || September 21 || @ Cardinals || 0–0 ||  ||  || — ||  || 0–0 || ?
|-style=background:#
| 154 || September 22 || @ Marlins || 0–0 ||  ||  || — ||  || 0–0 || ?
|-style=background:#
| 155 || September 23 || @ Marlins || 0–0 ||  ||  || — ||  || 0–0 || ?
|-style=background:#
| 156 || September 24 || @ Marlins || 0–0 ||  ||  || — ||  || 0–0 || ?
|-style=background:#
| 157 || September 26 || Cardinals || 0–0 ||  ||  || — ||  || 0–0 || ?
|-style=background:#
| 158 || September 27 || Cardinals || 0–0 ||  ||  || — ||  || 0–0 || ?
|-style=background:#
| 159 || September 28 || Cardinals || 0–0 ||  ||  || — ||  || 0–0 || ?
|-style=background:#
| 160 || September 29 || @ Cubs || 0–0 ||  ||  || — ||  || 0–0 || ?
|-style=background:#
| 161 || September 30 || @ Cubs || 0–0 ||  ||  || — ||  || 0–0 || ?
|-style=background:#
| 162 || October 1 || @ Cubs || 0–0 ||  ||  || — ||  || 0–0 || ?
|-

|- style="text-align:center;"
| Legend:       = Win       = Loss       = PostponementBold = Brewers team member

Farm system

The Brewers' farm system consists of eight minor league affiliates in 2023.

References

External links
2023 Milwaukee Brewers season at Baseball Reference
Milwaukee Brewers season Official Site

Milwaukee Brewers seasons
Milwaukee Brewers
Milwaukee Brewers